Baggrow is a small village situated north of the Lake District National Park in the English county of Cumbria, historically within Cumberland.

Governance
The village is in the parliamentary constituency of Workington, Mark Jenkinson is the Member of parliament.

For Local Government purposes it is in the Allhallows & Waverton Ward of Allerdale Borough Council and the  Aspatria Ward of Cumbria County Council.

Baggrow does not have its own parish council, instead it is part of Allhallows Parish Council. The Parish of Allhallows incorporates the three villages of Baggrow, Fletchertown and Watch Hill, together with the area of Mealsgate known as Pine Grove.

Railway

Baggrow railway station was a stop along the Bolton Loop of the Maryport and Carlisle Railway which used to run through the village serving the Brayton Knowle Colliery here, and the mine at nearby Mealsgate. The line has been dismantled but evidence of its existence and its use can be seen along the route.

References 

Villages in Cumbria
Allerdale